Maria de Assunção de Oliveira Cristas Machado da Graça (born 28 September 1974) is a Portuguese lawyer, professor and politician. She was the President of the CDS – People's Party from 2016 to 2020. 

Since 2017 she's also opposition leader councilwoman in the Lisbon City Council, elected with 21% of popular vote.

From 2011 to 2015, she served as Minister of Agriculture, Sea, Environment and Territorial Planning in the government led by Pedro Passos Coelho.

Life before politics

She is a lawyer by training and a professor at the New University of Lisbon. She graduated in law in 1997 by the University of Lisbon, was admitted in the Portuguese Bar Association in 1999 and completed her doctorate in Private Law in 2004.

Political career

Assunção Cristas has been a member of Democratic and Social Centre - People's Party since 2007. She was first elected to the Assembly of the Republic in 2009 elections, representing Leiria. She was re-elected in 2011 elections, participating in the negotiations between her party and the winning Social Democratic Party to form a coalition government.

Cristas led the CDS-PP into the 2019 elections. Her party was defeated, with the CDS-PP losing 13 seats and retaining only 5. She announced her resignation as leader of CDS-PP that evening.

See also 
 Ministry of Agriculture, Sea, Environment and Spatial Planning

References 

Agriculture ministers of Portugal
Environment ministers
Government ministers of Portugal
Living people
1974 births
University of Lisbon alumni